Etazocine (NIH-7856) is an opioid analgesic of the benzomorphan family which was never marketed. It acts as a partial agonist of the opioid receptors, with mixed agonist and antagonist effects. In animal studies, it was shown to induce analgesia, dependency, and respiratory depression, with overall effects similar to those of morphine, but with substantially reduced potency in comparison.

See also 
 Benzomorphan

References 

Phenols
Analgesics
Benzomorphans
Opioids